Kani Department is a department of Worodougou Region in Woroba District, Ivory Coast. In 2021, its population was 131,428 and its seat is the settlement of Kani. The sub-prefectures of the department are Djibrosso, Fadiadougou, Kani, and Morondo.

History
Kani Department was created in 2009 as a second-level subdivision via a split-off from Séguéla Department. At its creation, it was part of Worodougou Region.

In 2011, districts were introduced as new first-level subdivisions of Ivory Coast. At the same time, regions were reorganised and became second-level subdivisions and all departments were converted into third-level subdivisions. At this time, Kani Department remained part of the retained Worodougou Region in the new Woroba District.

Notes

Departments of Worodougou
States and territories established in 2009
2009 establishments in Ivory Coast